Cosmosoma intensa is a moth of the family Erebidae. It was described by Rothschild in 1910. It is found in Colombia.

References

intensa
Moths described in 1910